Bannus may refer to:
 Ban (medieval), the royal prerogative to rule and command
 The Bannus, a fictional reality-altering machine in the novel Hexwood by Diana Wynne Jones
 Bannus Lough, a lake in County Donegal, Ireland
 Bannus, a first-century hermit mentioned by Josephus